Retreat from Memphis is an album by English band the Mekons, released in 1994. It followed a few years of label troubles that saw the band considering a breakup.

The band supported the album by touring with Man or Astroman?

Production
The album was recorded in Chicago. Some of its songs engaged with military motifs; many were recorded after the band had played them on a 1993 tour. The Mekons brought in a new drummer for the recording sessions. Susie Honeyman, the band's violinist, was on maternity leave during much of the production of Retreat from Memphis. 

"Our Bad Dream", about the Mekons' time with Warner Bros. Records, incorporated elements of rap music. "Ice Rink in Berlin" was sung by Sally Timms.

Critical reception

The Washington Post wrote that "the exuberant eclecticism of the late-'80s Mekons has settled into an almost classic-rock sound, and the band's attempts to vary the sound on its new Retreat From Memphis are not inspiring." Entertainment Weekly thought that the album "finds them, as usual, gleefully musing in their wry, existential style on matters ranging from amorous entanglements to global upheaval." The San Diego Union-Tribune noted that "the Mekons fall back to rocking out with a neurotic, decidedly '80s post-punk edge."

Spin deemed Retreat from Memphis a "stronger, more classic-sounding [comeback]." The Austin American-Statesman labeled it "another album of borderline brilliance from these overeducated sociopolitical gadflies, one in which the zest of the music belies the deadpan dread of the lyrics." The Chicago Tribune considered it "one of the band's most spirited offerings of communal, life-affirming-here we go again-rock 'n' roll."

AllMusic called the album "direct, straightforward, and angry in a way the Mekons had not been for quite a while." The Rough Guide to Rock considered it "probably the weakest in The Mekons' catalogue."

Track listing

References

The Mekons albums
1994 albums
Quarterstick Records albums